Birch Run High School is a public high school located at 12450 Church Street in Birch Run, Michigan and part of the Birch Run Area Schools district. Birch Run's mascot is the panther, and its colors are blue and gold. The school's athletic program competes in the Tri-Valley Conference-East as a Class B school. Its team sports include baseball, basketball, bowling, cheerleading, cross country running, football, golf, powerlifting, soccer, softball, track and field, volleyball, wrestling.

References

External links
 

Public high schools in Michigan
Schools in Saginaw County, Michigan
Saginaw Intermediate School District